This is a list of the judgments given by the Supreme Court of the United Kingdom in the year 2012. They are ordered by Neutral citation.

The table lists judgments made by the court and the opinions of the judges in each case. Judges are treated as having concurred in another's judgment when they either formally attach themselves to the judgment of another or speak only to acknowledge their concurrence with one or more judges. Any judgment which reaches a conclusion which differs from the majority on one or more major points of the appeal has been treated as dissent.

All dates are for 2012 unless expressly stated otherwise.

Table key

2012 judgments

Notes

Judges
Lord Judge was the Lord Chief Justice and President of the Courts of England and Wales in 2012 but sat on four cases in the Supreme Court.
Lord Brown served until 9 April 2012. 
Lord Phillips served until 30 September 2012.
Lord Sumption became a justice on 11 January 2012. He replaced Lord Collins.
Lord Reed became a justice on 6 February 2012. He replaced Lord Rodger.
Lord Carnwath became a justice on 17 April 2012. He replaced Lord Brown.
Lord Neuberger became president of the supreme court on 1 October 2012. He replaced Lord Phillips.

External links
 Supreme Court decided cases, 2012

Supreme Court of the United Kingdom cases
Judgments of the Supreme Court of the United Kingdom
Supreme Court of the United Kingdom
United Kingdom law-related lists